The Lawless Land is a 1988 American science fiction adventure film directed by Jon Hess and starring Jsu Garcia, Amanda Peterson, Leon Robinson and Xander Berkeley.

Cast
Jsu Garcia as Falco
Leon Robinson as Road Kill
Xander Berkeley as Ez Andy
Amanda Peterson as Diana
Patricio Bunster as Don Enrique
Patricia Rivadeneira as Snake Woman
Javier Maldonado as Warden
Douglas Hubner as Chairman's Butler

References

External links
 
 

1980s science fiction adventure films
American science fiction adventure films
1988 directorial debut films
1980s English-language films
1980s American films